Giorgio Gorgone (Rome, 18 August 1976) is an Italian player in the role of midfielder, currently campaigning in Triestina. His debut in Serie B season takes place in 1998–1999 with the Lucchese.

In 2010–11 season he was excluded from squad and did not awarded a shirt number.

In 2012, he assisted Roberto Stellone as the vice coach of Frosinone Calcio.

References

External links

 

1976 births
Living people
Italian footballers
A.S. Lodigiani players
A.C. ChievoVerona players
Cagliari Calcio players
Delfino Pescara 1936 players
A.C. Perugia Calcio players
U.S. Triestina Calcio 1918 players
Virtus Bergamo Alzano Seriate 1909 players
Association football midfielders